Dimitry Caloin (born 8 May 1990) is a professional footballer who plays for FC Villefranche. Born in France, he represents Madagascar at international level.

Professional career
A youth product of FC Toulouse, Caloin moved to Limoges FC for seven years, eventually becoming vice-captain of the team. In the summer of 2017, he was transferred to SO Cholet in the Championnat National. He spent the 2018–19 season with Les Herbiers VF, and signed for FC Villefranche in August 2019.

International career
Caloin is born in France, and is of Malagasy descent through his mother. He made his debut for the Madagascar national football team in a 3–1 2019 Africa Cup of Nations qualification win over Sudan on 9 June 2017.

Career statistics

International

References

External links
 
 
 

1990 births
Living people
Sportspeople from Limoges
People with acquired Malagasy citizenship
Malagasy footballers
Madagascar international footballers
French footballers
French sportspeople of Malagasy descent
Malagasy people of French descent
Association football midfielders
Limoges FC players
SO Cholet players
Les Herbiers VF players
FC Villefranche Beaujolais players
Championnat National players
Championnat National 2 players
2019 Africa Cup of Nations players
Footballers from Nouvelle-Aquitaine
Black French sportspeople